The 2006–07 Slovenian PrvaLiga season started on 29 July 2006 and ended on 26 May 2007. Each team played a total of 36 matches.

League table

Relegation play-offs

Interblock won 4–2 on aggregate.

Results
Every team plays four times against their opponents, twice at home and twice on the road, for a total of 36 matches.

First half of the season

Second half of the season

Top goalscorers 

Source: PrvaLiga.si

See also
2006–07 Slovenian Football Cup
2006–07 Slovenian Second League

References
General

Specific

External links
Official website of the PrvaLiga 

Slovenian PrvaLiga seasons
Slovenia
1